Cameron Bryce (born 20 July 1995) is a Scottish curler from Kelso. He currently skips his own team out of Stirling.

Career
Bryce has twice skipped Scotland at the World Mixed Curling Championship. He and teammates Katie Murray, Bobby Lammie and Sophie Jackson finished 9th place at the 2015 World Mixed Curling Championship. The team was much more successful at the 2016 World Mixed Curling Championship. The team won their group with an undefeated  6–0 record, and then went on to beat Canada in the quarterfinals before losing to Sweden in the semifinal. In the bronze medal game, Scotland defeated South Korea.

After winning the 2017 Scottish Junior Men's Curling Championship, Bryce skipped Scotland at the 2017 World Junior Curling Championships. He and his rink of Robin Brydone, Euan Kyle and Frazer Shaw would finish the round robin portion of the tournament with a 6–3 record, in 3rd place. In the playoffs, they would beat Norway in the 3 vs. 4 game, but lost to South Korea in the semifinal and then lost to Norway in a rematch in the bronze medal game, settling for fourth place.

Bryce and teammates Ross Whyte, Brydone and Kyle would win his first World Curling Tour event at the 2017 Tallinn Challenger.

References

External links

Living people
1995 births
Scottish male curlers
People from Kelso, Scottish Borders